The Earth, a Small Man, His Dog and a Chicken is the thirteenth studio album by REO Speedwagon, and was released in 1990.

It marked the end of their contract with Epic Records and is, to date, the last REO album to chart, peaking at No. 129 on the Billboard 200. The song "Love Is a Rock" reached No. 65 on Billboard's Hot 100, and "Live It Up" reached No. 6 on Billboard's Hot Mainstream Rock Tracks. "Go For Broke" was written for the film Days of Thunder but ultimately not used.

Following the departure of two long-time members, guitarist and songwriter Gary Richrath and drummer Alan Gratzer, more than half of the songs on this album were written or co-written by keyboardist Jesse Harms. It is also the first album to include guitarist Dave Amato and drummer Bryan Hitt who remain with the band as of 2023.

Track listing

Personnel 
REO Speedwagon 
 Kevin Cronin – lead vocals, acoustic guitar
 Dave Amato – lead guitars, backing vocals
 Neal Doughty – organ
 Bruce Hall – bass
 Bryan Hitt – drums, percussion

Additional performers
 Jesse Harms – keyboards, backing vocals
 Steve Forman – percussion 
 Debra Dobkin – backing vocals 
 Beth Hooker – backing vocals 
 Darlene Koldenhoven – backing vocals 
 Janis Liebhart – backing vocals 
 Andrea Robinson – backing vocals 
 Machan Taylor – backing vocals 
 Terry Wood – backing vocals

Production 
 Kevin Cronin – producer 
 Jesse Harms – producer 
 Tom Lord-Alge – producer, recording (3-11), mixing 
 Jim Scott – producer (1, 2), recording (1, 2)
 Julie Last – assistant engineer (1, 2)
 Steve Gallagher – assistant engineer (3-11)
 Mike Tacci – assistant engineer (3-11)
 Ted Jensen – mastering at Sterling Sound (New York City, New York).
 David Coleman – art direction, design 
 Mark Ryden – illustration
 Dennis Keeley – photography

Charts

Album

Singles

Release history

References

External links 

REO Speedwagon albums
1990 albums
Epic Records albums
Albums produced by Tom Lord-Alge
Albums produced by Kevin Cronin